Mercy Secondary School, Mounthawk is a school in Kerry, Ireland, which has approximately 1,300 pupils and 105 teachers (85 permanent and 20 substitutes).

Description
Mounthawk offers the core subjects English, Irish and Mathematics as well as optional subjects such as Art, Science (Physics, Chemistry, Biology and Agricultural), Music, Home Economics, Technical Graphics, Construction (Woodwork), Engineering (Metalwork), Applied Mathematics, French, German and Spanish within three educational frameworks - Leaving Certificate, Leaving Certificate Applied and Leaving Certificate Vocational Programme.

The school also contains sport facilities including a large sized indoor basketball court with adjoining dressing rooms and an outdoor basketball court. In addition, there are a full-sized GAA pitch and two smaller training pitches.

Basketball
The school reached the 2022 All-Ireland U-19 basketball finals where they ceded to St Malachy's College 53-54 at Ireland's National Basketball Arena in Dublin.

Charity work 
Mercy Mounthawk is currently paired with schools in Nairobi, Kenya and Pakistan.

References

External links
 Official website

Buildings and structures in Tralee
Education in Tralee
Secondary schools in County Kerry
Educational institutions established in 2001
2001 establishments in Ireland
Sisters of Mercy schools